Ryukyukoku Matsuri Daiko North Carolina is chapter of the Okinawan Eisa taiko ensemble Ryukyukoku Matsuri Daiko.  The organization has chapters in Okinawa Prefecture, mainland Japan, Argentina, Brazil, Peru, Bolivia, and various US locations.

History
The Ryukyukoku Matsuri Daiko (Ryukyu Kingdom Festival Drums) was formed in Okinawa in 1982 by former members of an Okinawan City youth group. The Ryukyu Kingdom is the ancient name for what is presently known as Okinawa, Japan. Located just southwest of mainland Japan and northeast of Taiwan, it consists of about fifty islands, of which Okinawa is the largest. Due to its unique location, its culture and traditions have been greatly influenced not only by Japan, but also China, Korea and southeast Asia.

In 1994 a chapter of this organization was formed in Jacksonville, North Carolina.  The group ranges in age from 5 years through late 20s.  The group has performed at many festivals and events in North Carolina as well as New York City, Washington, DC and Virginia.

Music and Choreography

Ryukyukoku Matsuri Daiko's type of drum dancing is based on the old tradition of "eisa" (Okinawan obon drum dancing), but has a distinctive style of high kicks, karate moves and synchronized dance choreography. This organization was formed for the purpose of providing activities for the teenage youth group to keep them gainfully occupied.  The young people of Okinawa gather in the summer "eisa" festival to dance for their ancestors.  Using a variety of drums, they sing and dance asking their ancestors for good health and prosperity.  The performers dance and drum simultaneously to an exciting blend of traditional and contemporary Okinawan and Japanese music.  The group performs with several types of drums: the odaiko (big drum), which is suspended in front of the body by long pieces of purple cloth over the shoulder and back, the shime-daiko (hand-held, flat, two-sided drum), and the paranku (hand-held, flat, one-sided drum).

The logo for all Ryukyukoku Matsuri Daiko chapters around the world is a stylized version of the Japanese kanji for heart imposed over a circle in red and white. The logo symbolizes the spirit of Okinawan eisa taiko and friendship spreading around the world, a theme often promoted by the club.

Performers wear a black and white uniform styled on a Chinese costume called mumunchinhata. The uniform includes a red and gold obi and hachimaki or sagi for members in high school and older. Younger performers wear pink. Adult performers who use only the paranku wear yellow. There are a variety of other colored uniforms including yellow, red and green worn by performers who are dancing special parts.

Notes

References
 Kerr, George H. (1965). Okinawa, the History of an Island People. Rutland, Vermont: C.E. Tuttle Co.
 Eisa. (n.d.). In Webster's Dictionary online. Retrieved from http://www.websters-online-dictionary.org/definitions/Eisa+%28dance%29?cx=partner-pub-0939450753529744%3Av0qd01-tdlq&cof=FORID%3A9&ie=UTF-8&q=Eisa+%28dance%29&sa=Search#906

External links
 Ryukyukoku Matsuri Daiko North Carolina Facebook Page http://www.facebook.com/people/Nc-Ryukyukoku-Matsuri-Daiko/100001662871600
 Ryukyukoku Matsuri Daiko Okinawa http://www.ryucom.ne.jp/users/m-taiko/

Okinawan culture
Okinawa Culture